Dan Collins (born July 26, 1976) is a former American football guard in the National Football League who played for the Dallas Cowboys. He also played for the NFL-Europe team Rhein Fire and the XFL team the Orlando Rage.

References 

1976 births
Living people
American football offensive guards
Boston College Eagles football players
Dallas Cowboys players
Rhein Fire players
Orlando Rage players